Iton is a genus of grassskippers in the family Hesperiidae. It has two species, both found in the Indomalayan realm.

The genus was named by Lionel de Nicéville in 1895.

Species
Iton semamora (Moore, [1866]) Sikkim - Assam, Burma, Malaya
Iton watsonii (de Nicéville, 1890) Burma

References
Natural History Museum Lepidoptera genus database

Specific

Hesperiinae
Hesperiidae genera